Treehouse Masters is an American reality television series that aired on Animal Planet and starred Pete Nelson, a master treehouse builder and owner of Nelson Treehouse and Supply. Each episode, Nelson and his team design and build custom treehouses for clients across the country. The show debuted on May 31, 2013 and ended on September 29, 2018.

On April 18, 2019, the series was cancelled after 11 seasons.

Cast 

 Pete Nelson – Master treehouse designer, builder, and self-proclaimed "tree whisperer" who loves nature and spending time in the woods. He believes trees have personalities andao that treehouses are "the ultimate return to nature."
 Daryl McDonald – Lead Foreman at Nelson Treehouse and Supply
 Charlie Nelson – Pete's son and Nelson Treehouse and Supply Carpenter
 Henry Nelson – Pete's son and Nelson Treehouse and Supply Builder
 Alex Meyer – Carpenter and Project Manager; has a background in rock climbing
 Chuck McLellan – Craftsman at Nelson Treehouse and Supply
 Seanix Zenobia – Carpenter at Nelson Treehouse and Supply
 Tory Jones – Art Director and on-camera interior designer Seasons 1 – 8
 Christina Salway – Art Director and on-camera interior designer Seasons 9 – 11

In popular culture 
Treehouse Masters was mentioned as a favorite show of lead character Jimmy Shive-Overly on FXX's You're The Worst.

Daniel Tosh spoofed the show in the 2016 Tosh.0 episode "Tree Fall Kid."

Series overview

Episodes

Season 1 (2013)

Season 2 (2013–2014)

Season 3 (2014)

Season 4 (2014–2015)

Season 5 (2015)

Season 6 (2015–2016)

Season 7 (2016)

Season 8 (2016–2017)

Season 9 (2017)

Season 10 (2018)

Season 11 (2018)

References

20. Tory Jones

External links
 
Nelson Treehouse and Supply

Animal Planet original programming
2013 American television series debuts
2018 American television series endings
2010s American reality television series